The first German man-portable flamethrower was called the Kleinflammenwerfer ('small flamethrower') or Kleif. Fuel was stored in a large vertical, cylindrical backpack container. High-pressure propellant was stored in another, smaller container attached to the fuel tank. A long hose connected the fuel tank to a lance tube with an igniting device at the nozzle. The propellant forced the fuel through the hose and out of the nozzle at high speed when a valve was opened. The igniting device at the nozzle set fire to the fuel as it sprayed out. The flamethrower was operated by two soldiers, one carrying the fuel and propellant tanks, another wielding the lance (though it was 31.8 kg it could be operated by one soldier). Wex, a replacement for the Kleif, was introduced in 1917 after the third battle of Ypres.

The Kleinflammenwerfer was created by and developed by Richard Fiedler, alongside the Grossflammenwerfer, which was a larger flamethrower.

See also
List of flamethrowers

References

External links
 History of German Flamethrower Development

1910s establishments in Germany
1910s disestablishments in Germany
Flamethrowers
World War I German infantry weapons